Chrášťany or Chrašťany may refer to places in the Czech Republic:

Chrášťany (Benešov District), a municipality and village in the Central Bohemian Region
Chrášťany (České Budějovice District), a municipality and village in the South Bohemian Region
Chrášťany (Kolín District), a municipality and village in the Central Bohemian Region
Chrášťany (Prague-West District), a municipality and village in the Central Bohemian Region
Chrášťany (Rakovník District), a municipality and village in the Central Bohemian Region
Chrášťany, a village and part of Hulín in the Zlín Region
Chrašťany, a village and part of Krásný Dvůr in the Ústí nad Labem Region
Chrášťany, a village and part of Podsedice in the Ústí nad Labem Region